Harold Edward Nash (10 April 1892 – 1970) was an English professional footballer who played as an inside forward.

Career
Born in Fishponds, Nash played for several Welsh clubs in the Southern Football League before joining Aston Villa in 1914. He later played for Coventry City, Cardiff City and Merthyr Town before moving into non-league football.

References

1892 births
1970 deaths
English footballers
Mardy A.F.C. players
Abertillery Town F.C. players
Treharris Athletic Western F.C. players
Aston Villa F.C. players
Coventry City F.C. players
Cardiff City F.C. players
Merthyr Town F.C. players
English Football League players
Association football forwards